Type locality may refer to:

 Type locality (biology)
 Type locality (geology)

See also 
 Local (disambiguation)
 Locality (disambiguation)